Charles Anthony Fry (born 14 January 1940) is an English former first-class cricketer and now a cricket administrator. He is the grandson of the legendary C. B. Fry – his father Stephen Fry also played first-class cricket for Hampshire.

Charles Fry was educated at Repton School, where he was captain of cricket, and Trinity College, Oxford. He made his first-class debut for Oxford University in 1959 scoring 576 runs at an average of 26.18 including a maiden century against the Free Foresters, sharing an unbroken fifth-wicket partnership of 256 with Abbas Ali Baig which remains a first-class record for the fifth wicket for Oxford. He won a Blue and subsequently played in two more Varsity matches as a middle-order batsman, in the second of which he stood in as wicket-keeper.

Fry played a handful of matches for Hampshire in the 1960 season in one of which he was twice bowled (for 14 and 1) in a match (versus Sussex) by one of his successors as President of the MCC Robin Marlar. He did not appear for the County in their championship-winning season in 1961.

Fry appeared once for Northamptonshire in 1962 and a couple of times for the Free Foresters against his old University later in the 1960s. Fry has had a long association with the Marylebone Cricket Club whose President he became in 2003-04. He was widely praised for choosing Tom Graveney as his successor – the first time an ex-professional cricketer had held this office. Fry has held many other positions within the MCC, including chairman of the club itself and, most recently, chairman of the MCC Foundation.

References

1940 births
Living people
English cricketers
Hampshire cricketers
Northamptonshire cricketers
Free Foresters cricketers
Oxford University cricketers
People educated at Repton School
Alumni of Trinity College, Oxford
Presidents of the Marylebone Cricket Club